Yevhen Hapon, also spelt Eugeny Gapon and Ievgen Gapon, better known by his stage name Knjaz Varggoth, is one of the foremost figures in Eastern Europe  black metal and far-right musicians.

Biography 
Yevhen Hapon was born July 30, 1974. He is better known by his stage name Knjaz Varggoth.

Knjaz Varggoth is one of the foremost figures in Eastern Europe  black metal and far-right musicians. Though he has been involved with numerous music projects and bands (Aryan Terrorism, Mistigo Varggoth Darkestra, Lucifugum as a guest musician in 1997, Вече, and more), he is most well known for being the lead vocalist and guitarist for the controversial Ukrainian black metal band Nokturnal Mortum. Nokturnal Mortum gained their reputation performing symphonic black metal with elements of Ukrainian and Slavic folk music and for being a part of the eastern European NSBM scene.

A side project done by Varggoth is the ambient/black metal project Mistigo Varggoth Darkestra, formed in 1994. The most famous album of this project, The Key To The Gates Of The Apocalypse, is most likely known particularly due to its long runtime (one 72-minute track) and combination of dark ambient and fast black metal.

Knjaz Varggoth also formed the Neo-Nazi hatecore group Aryan Terrorism.

Discography

Bands (In order of formation)

Suppuration
1992: Ecclesiastical Blasphemy

Crystaline Darkness
1993: Mi Agama Khaz Mifisto

Mistigo Varggoth Darkestra
1997: Midnight Fullmoon
1999: The Key to the Gates of the Apocalypse

Nokturnal Mortum
1995: Twilightfall
1996: Lunar Poetry
1997: Goat Horns
1998: To the Gates of Blasphemous Fire
1999: Nechrist
2005: Weltanschauung
2009: The Voice of Steel
2017: Verity

Aryan Terrorism
2002: W.A.R

Vetche
1998: Vetche

Piorun 
2004: Stajemy Jak Ojce

Temnozor
Live Member

References

Living people
1974 births
Ukrainian heavy metal guitarists
Ukrainian fascists
21st-century Ukrainian singers
21st-century guitarists
Ukrainian neo-Nazis
Far-right politics in Ukraine